The , also known as the Tōkaidō corridor, is the megalopolis in Japan extending from Ibaraki Prefecture in the northeast to Fukuoka Prefecture in the southwest, running for almost . Its population is about 74.7 million.

The urbanization zone runs mainly along the Pacific coast (hence the name) of Japan from Kantō region to Osaka, and the Inland Sea (on both sides) to Fukuoka, and is concentrated along the Tōkaidō-Sanyō rail corridor. A view of Japan at night clearly shows a rather dense and continuous strip of light (demarcating urban zones) that delineates the region. 
The high population is particularly due to the large plains – the Kantō Plain, Kinai Plain, and Nōbi Plain – which facilitate building in mountainous Japan. 

Although the Taiheiyō Belt contains the majority of Japan's population, references to the term in Japanese are mainly economic or regional in nature. The term was first used in 1960 in an Economic Commission Subcommittee Report formed to double the national income.  At that time, it was identified as the core of the nation's industrial complex.  Other than the Miyagi area, nearly all manufacturing industry in the nation lies in this zone, accounting for 81% of the nation's economic output in 2007 (about 4–5 trillion).

The region is specifically defined by the Ministry of International Trade and Industry as the following prefectures: Ibaraki, Saitama, Chiba, Tokyo, Kanagawa, Shizuoka, Aichi, Gifu, Mie, Osaka, Hyōgo, Wakayama, Okayama, Hiroshima, Yamaguchi, Fukuoka and Oita.

The Sea of Japan has a much less well-developed string of cities, called  (literally "inner side of Japan"), stretching 1000 km from Akita to Yamaguchi. It is often referenced in relation to the Taiheiyo belt.  The Shinkansen line south (and west) of Tokyo runs the course through the belt cities.

Major cities 

Listed from north to south:

May also include:

See also
 List of metropolitan areas in Japan by population

References

Metropolitan areas of Japan
Belt regions